Salwah is a village in Syria, administratively part of Idlib Governorate. It is located just west of the Dead Cities. Nearby localities include Jalmah to the north, Darat Izza to the southeast, Talaadah to the southeast, al-Dana to the south, and Atme and Qah to the west. According to the Syria Central Bureau of Statistics (CBS), Salwah had a population of 3,244 in 2004.

References

Populated places in Harem District